HNLMS Prins van Oranje was a Prins van Oranje-class minelayer of the Royal Netherlands Navy build by N.V. Internationale Scheepsbouw Mij. 'De Maas'. She was designed for service in the Dutch East Indies. She was sunk during World War II by Japanese forces.

Construction
Prins van Oranje was laid down on 20 September 1930. She was launched on 10 July 1931 and commissioned on 2 February 1932.

Service history
On 9 March 1932 Prins van Oranje left the Netherlands for the Dutch East Indies.

In December 1941 she laid a minefield near Tarakan.

In an attempt to reach Surabaja, she was caught by Japanese forces on 12 January 1942. The Japanese destroyer  and Patrolboat 38 sunk Prins van Oranje with gunfire, causing the loss of 102 sailors lives.

Sources
 

1931 ships
Mine warfare vessel classes
Minelayers of the Royal Netherlands Navy
World War II minelayers of the Netherlands
World War II shipwrecks in the Pacific Ocean